Christopher Lund Nissen (born 31 January 1992) is a Danish singer from Copenhagen, signed to EMI Denmark. In November 2012, he won an award at the Danish Music Awards 2012. He was awarded New Thinker of the Year (Årets nytænker), given by Spotify as an innovation prize. Christopher has released five albums, the debut Colours (2012), followed by Told You So (2014), Closer (2016), Under the Surface (2019) and My Blood (2021). Christopher's songs include "Against the Odds, "Nothing in Common", "Told You So", "CPH Girls" and "I Won't Let You Down".

Career
Christopher started singing covers of other singers' songs. His debut single was "Against the Odds", co-written by Kay & Ndustry, Kasper Larsen, Ole Brodersen, Curtis Richa and Johan Wetterberg, and produced by Kay & Ndustry and GL Music's Lasse Lindorff. It was released in September 2011, reaching number 23 on the Danish Singles Chart. The accompanying music video is directed by Nicolas Tobias Følsgaard and Jonas Lodahl Andersen. His follow-up single "Nothing in Common" entered the Danish Singles Chart at number 5 in 2012. His debut album Colours was released in 2013. "CPH Girls" was Christopher's 1st single number one in Denmark. Christopher's third studio album Closer came out on 15 April 2016. It includes his earlier hit "Tulips" that came out in Denmark, Norway and China, "I Won't Let You Down" featuring Bekuh Boom becoming his second number 1 in Denmark and the track "Limousine" with the artist Madcon. Christopher gets his inspiration for Michael Jackson, Justin Timberlake, Bruno Mars and John Mayer.

Personal life
He was born in Frederiksberg, but later moved to Amager, Denmark with his parents and little brother Oliver. In 2012  Christopher moved in with his girlfriend  the Danish singer Medina. The couple later split up. In 2014, he began a relationship with Danish model Cecilie Haugaard. The couple married in June 2019. They welcomed their first child, a daughter named Noelle, in 2021. The pair is expecting a new baby to be born in 2023, but gender and name isnt revealed yet.

Discography

Albums

Studio albums

Singles

As lead artist

Notes

Collaborations

As a featured artist

Guest appearances

Filmography and TV 
 Haps du er fanget (2012)
Go' Morgen Danmark (2012, 2013, 2014, 2015, 2016)
Danish Music Awards (2012, 2013, 2014, 2015)
 X Factor (2014, 2016)
Jeg er Christopher (2014)
Natholdet (2014, 2015)
 Aftenshowet (2014)
 Danmarksindsamling (2016)
 Vi ses hos Celment (2016)
 Akademi Fantasia (2016) - Malaysia Guest artist (Week 5)

Prizes 
2 The voice prize 2017
 Danish Music Awards Årets Nytænker 2012
 The voice Årets Flirt 2012
 The voice The Body Art 2012
 The voice Årets Instagrammer 2013
 Gaffa-prisen Årets Mandlige Kunstner 2014
 Danish Music Awards Publikumsprisen 2014
 Danish Music Awards Årets Danske popudgivelsen 2014
 MTV Europe Music Awards for årets danske band 2014
 The voice Årets Trendsætter 2014
 The Voice Årets Idol 2014
 Danish Music Awards Årets Danske Club Navn 2014
 Zulu Awards Årets Mandlige Kunstner 2015
 The voice-pris 2015

Tours
Colours Tour 2012-2013
Christopher Tour 2013
Told you So Tour 2014-2015
Tulips Tour 2015
Closer Tour 2016
Europe Tour 2020
Korea Tour 2022

References

External links

English-language singers from Denmark
1992 births
Living people
People from Frederiksberg
People from Tårnby Municipality
Singers from Copenhagen
21st-century Danish male singers
Danish male singer-songwriters